Kenja Turaev (born 1 March 1989) is an Uzbekistani footballer who plays for home town club Nasaf Qarshi which is playing in Uzbek League as a striker.

In the 2012 Olympics Football Tournament qualifiers, he was called to the Uzbekistan U23 team and he scored 1 goals for his team.

References

External links 
 

1989 births
Living people
Uzbekistani footballers
Uzbekistan international footballers
FC Nasaf players
Association football midfielders
People from Qashqadaryo Region
Footballers at the 2010 Asian Games
Asian Games competitors for Uzbekistan